Paradise Valley may refer to:

Places

Canada 
Paradise Valley, Alberta, a village in Central Alberta
Paradise Valley (Alberta), a valley in  Kananaskis Country, western Alberta
Paradise Valley in Banff National Park, Canada
Paradise Valley, British Columbia, a rural community near Brackendale/Squamish, British Columbia

United States 
Paradise Valley (Montana), a river valley in Park County, Montana
Paradise Valley, Arizona, a town and suburb of Phoenix, Arizona
Paradise Valley, Detroit, a neighborhood in Detroit, Michigan
Paradise Valley, Nevada, a census-designated place in Humboldt County, Nevada
Paradise Valley, Pennsylvania, an unincorporated community in Monroe County, Pennsylvania
Paradise Valley, Phoenix, a neighborhood in Phoenix, Arizona

Other
Paradise Valley, Morocco

Fictional places
Paradise Valley, the setting for the TV series The Secret World of Alex Mack

Other
Paradise Valley (film), a 1934 American western film
Paradise Valley (album), a 2013 album by John Mayer

See also

Paradise Mountain (disambiguation)